"Nasty Freestyle" is the debut single by American rapper T-Wayne. The song, a freestyle over the beat to Bandit Gang Marco's "Nasty" (2014), became a viral sensation in the spring of 2015; in particular, popular user-generated videos posted to Instagram and Vine featuring the song's opening couplet fueled the song's rise to prominence. Released as a digital download in the United States by 300 Entertainment on May 4, 2015, it soon became a commercial success, peaking at number nine on the US Billboard Hot 100. As of July 2015, it has sold 785,562 copies domestically. At the week ending April 26, the song had been streamed 6.4 million times in the US.

Music video
Nasty Freestyle's music video was uploaded on T-Wayne's YouTube channel on February 28, 2015.  The video consists of T-Wayne dancing around while lip syncing. The video was deemed to be low quality due to the shaky camera work, and a new one was filmed and was released a month later.

Remix
The official remix features Ty Dolla Sign and Chedda Da Connect. A music video of the remix was released on WorldStarHipHop YouTube channel on October 2, 2015.

Track listing

Chart performance

Weekly charts

Year-end charts

Certifications

Release history

References

2015 debut singles
2015 songs
300 Entertainment singles
Songs written by 30 Roc